Charles Woodruff House may refer to:

Charles Woodruff House (Southington, Connecticut), listed on the National Register of Historic Places in Hartford County, Connecticut
Charles Woodruff House (Wyoming, Ohio), listed on the National Register of Historic Places in Hamilton County, Ohio